The 2001 British Superbike Championship season was the 13th season. The title was won by John Reynolds aboard the Reve Red Bull Ducati winning 12 of the 26 races. Reynolds' nearest challenger Steve Hislop was in title contention until he was injured in the second race at Rockingham ruled him out for the rest of the season. 
Changes to the qualifying structure to try and make it more of a spectacle with the introduction of the Superpole format.  
With the British Superbike Championship being broadcast on the BBC for this season superbikes became more popular with a rise in audience of 42%.

Calendar

Entry List

Championship Tables

Riders' Championship

Privateers' Championship

References

British Superbike Championship
British
British Superbike Championship